Back to the Who Tour 51! was a 2016 concert tour of Europe & North America by British band The Who.

Overview
The tour was announced, in part, on 3 May 2016 and is the continuity of the band's previous tour, The Who Hits 50!.

The new tour included a return visit to the Isle of Wight Festival (at the Seaclose Park in Newport, England) on the opening date and ended at the Empire Polo Grounds in Indio, California on 16 October 2016 after thirteen concerts.

Tour band
The Who
Roger Daltrey – lead vocals, harmonica, acoustic guitar, rhythm guitar, tambourine
Pete Townshend – lead guitar, acoustic guitar, vocals

Backing musicians
John Corey – keyboards, backing vocals, percussion, bass harmonica
Loren Gold – keyboards, backing vocals, percussion, jaw harp
Pino Palladino – bass guitar
Frank Simes – keyboards, backing vocals, percussion, banjo, mandolin
Zak Starkey – drums, percussion
Simon Townshend – rhythm guitar, acoustic guitar, vocals

Tour dates
Source:

The five UK dates scheduled for August / September 2016, originally billed as "Greatest Hits" shows, have been moved to 2017 to coincide with the Royal Albert Hall dates, as part of the 2017 Tommy & More tour.

Cancelled shows
Source:

Notes

References

External links
The Who Online Concert Guide

The Who concert tours
2016 concert tours